Eryaman is a neighbourhood of Etimesgut district in Ankara, Turkey. It is located 28 km west of the city centre of Ankara. Population of the neighbourhood is around 150,000.

See also
 Güzelkent, Etimesgut

Image gallery

Galeri

References

External links
 Local news portal of Eryaman 

Neighbourhoods of Etimesgut